Nancy Pearson (née Wallace) is an American curler.

At the national level, she is a four-time United States women's champion curler (1979, 1981, 1983, 1988). She competed for the United States at four .

Teams

Personal life
She started curling at the age of 19, finished in 1997. Some years later, she started to compete as triathlon athlete.

References

External links

Ссылки 
 National Champions | Granite Curling Club of Seattle
 
 

Living people
American female curlers
American curling champions
Year of birth missing (living people)
Place of birth missing (living people)